is a Japanese track and field sprinter who specialises in the 400 metres. His personal best in the event is 45.85 seconds. He competed in the 4 × 400 metres relay at the 2017 World Championships.

Personal bests

International competition

National titles

References

External links

Kosuke Horii at Sumitomo Electric 

1994 births
Living people
Japanese male sprinters
Sportspeople from Saitama Prefecture
World Athletics Championships athletes for Japan
21st-century Japanese people